The 59th Annual Miss Universe Puerto Rico pageant was held at the Luis A. Ferré Performing Arts Center in Santurce, San Juan, Puerto Rico on October 3, 2013.

Monic Perez, who won the title of Miss Universe Puerto Rico 2013, crowned her successor as Miss Universe Puerto Rico 2014, Gabriela Berrios, of Toa Baja, who represented Puerto Rico at Miss Universe 2014 on January 25, 2015 in Doral, Florida, United States.

Results

Placements

Miss Universe Puerto Rico 2014 Mall Tour
The delegates of the Miss Universe Puerto Rico 2014 edition, made a summer mall tour. During the tour the delegates competed on different mini competitions and presented Sears summer season clothes on the runway. The mall tour mini competition awards were given as follows:

Gala de Premios (Special Awards Gala)
The Special Awards Gala took place on September 25, 2013 and the following awards were given:

These awards will be given during the pageant on October 3:

Best National Costume

Contestants

Here is a list of the official 28 contestants:

Notes
 Miss Toa Baja, Gabriela Berrios, competed at Miss Universe Puerto Rico 2012 as Toa Alta and finished as 2nd runner-up. She also competed at Miss Supranational 2012 and finished in Top 10.
 Miss Bayamón, Aleyda Ortiz, later placed 1st runner-up at Miss Intercontinental 2013 and later competed at Nuestra Belleza Latina 2014 where she became the third Puerto Rican woman to be crowned Nuestra Belleza Latina.
 Miss Carolina, Linoshka Castro, was Miss Turismo Latino 2011. She also competed at Miss Earth Puerto Rico 2011 where she placed 2nd runner-up.
 Miss Cayey, Patricia Quiñones, competed at Miss Puerto Rico Universe 2009 representing Rio Grande. She placed in Top 10. She later won the title of Miss Puerto Rico International 2014 and was to represent the island at Miss International 2014 before withdrawing due to personal reasons. Her 1st Runner-Up, Valerie Hernandez, took her place at the pageant where she was crowned the winner.
 Miss Arecibo, Suzette Rivera, represented Puerto Rico at Reina Hispanoamericana 2013 where she placed 4th runner-up.
 Miss Hatillo, Carla Harrison, competed at Miss Mundo de Puerto Rico 2009 representing Camuy. She placed in Top 12.
 Miss Yabucoa, Tershya Soto, competed at Nuestra Belleza Latina 2013. She placed in Top 20 semi-finalists.
 Miss Río Grande, Larissa Santiago, would later represent Puerto Rico at Miss Supranational 2017 where she finished as 4th Runner-Up and later  went on to compete at Miss Universe Puerto Rico 2018 representing Fajardo where she finished in the Top 6.
 Miss Luquillo, Maria Rivera, competed at Miss Universe Puerto Rico 2013 representing Guaynabo. She didn't classify.
 Miss Dorado, Kristhielee Caride, would later compete at Miss Universe Puerto Rico 2016 representing Isabela where she won and was represent Puerto Rico at Miss Universe 2016 until her dethronement on March 17, 2016. She was replaced by 1st Runner-Up Brenda Jiménez who represented the island at Miss Universe 2016 in Manila, Philippines where she failed to place in the Top 13.
Miss Salinas, Natacha Romero, would later compete at Miss Universe Puerto Rico 2017 representing Guayama where she finished in the Top 10.

Historical significance
 Toa Baja won Miss Universe Puerto Rico for the first time.
 The following municipalities also made the semi-finals last year were Arecibo, Cayey, Orocovis, and Toa Baja.
 Toa Baja placed for the fifth consecutive year.
 Cayey placed for the third consecutive year.
 Luquillo last placed in 2000.
 Cidra last placed in 2004.
 Añasco last placed in 2006.
 Cabo Rojo last placed in 2009.
 Dorado and Juana Diaz last placed in 2010.
 Bayamón and San Juan last placed in 2011.
 Camuy, Carolina, Río Grande, and Yabucoa last placed in 2012.
 Gabriela Berrios is the first Miss Universe Puerto Rico since Uma Blasini to win the competition after placing runner-up a previous year. Blasini placed 4th runner-up in 2005 and won in 2007. She is also the fifth consecutive winner of Miss Universe Puerto Rico to also win the Payless Best Catwalk Award.

References

2013 in Puerto Rico
Puerto Rico 2014
2014 beauty pageants